Music Album was a Canadian music television series which aired on CBC Television from 1970 to 1971.

Premise
This series featured Canadian musical performers in the popular, light classic and show tune genres. Toronto-produced episodes featured Lucio Agostini conducting the show orchestra while the conductor for the Vancouver-produced episodes was Ricky Hyslop. Wally Koster was a frequent guest artist and Howard Cable was a guest conductor.

Scheduling
This half-hour series was broadcast Thursdays at 9:30 p.m. (Eastern) from its debut on 17 September 1970. On 4 February 1971, Music Album moved to a Thursday 10:00 p.m. time slot, then finally a Monday 7:30 p.m. time slot from 24 May until its concluding episode on 28 June 1971.

References

External links
 

CBC Television original programming
1970 Canadian television series debuts
1971 Canadian television series endings
Television shows filmed in Toronto
Television shows filmed in Vancouver